John Cornelius Williams Jr. (born November 9, 1938) was an American politician in the state of South Carolina. He served in the South Carolina House of Representatives as a member of the Democratic Party from 1969 to 1974, representing Spartanburg County, South Carolina. He is a lawyer.

References

1938 births
Living people
Democratic Party members of the South Carolina House of Representatives
South Carolina lawyers
Politicians from Spartanburg, South Carolina